Aleksi Ristola (born 6 November 1989) is a Finnish football player currently playing for Finnish side Turun Palloseura.

References

External links
 
 
 
 
 
 

1989 births
Living people
Finnish footballers
Turun Palloseura footballers
FC Honka players
Veikkausliiga players
Åbo IFK players
Association football wingers
Footballers from Helsinki
21st-century Finnish people